Foreign relations exist between Australia and Egypt. Australian soldiers were stationed in Egypt in both world wars. After almost a century, the main traffic between Australia and Europe has passed the Suez Canal, Cairo was the main air link from Australia and London for many years. Australia and Egypt work constructively on international security issues such as counter-terrorism, disarmament, and the prevention of the proliferation of weapons of mass destruction. Diplomatic relations between Australia and Egypt were established between both countries in 1950. Australia has an embassy in Cairo, while Egypt has an embassy in Canberra and two Consulates-General (in Melbourne and Sydney).

See also 
 Egyptian Australian

References

External links 
 Australian Department of Foreign Affairs and Trade about relations with Egypt
  Australian embassy Cairo
  Egyptian embassy in Canberra
  Egyptian Consulate-General in Sydney